Posey Township is the name of seven townships in the U.S. state of Indiana:

 Posey Township, Clay County, Indiana
 Posey Township, Fayette County, Indiana
 Posey Township, Franklin County, Indiana
 Posey Township, Harrison County, Indiana
 Posey Township, Rush County, Indiana
 Posey Township, Switzerland County, Indiana
 Posey Township, Washington County, Indiana

Indiana township disambiguation pages